Joe Matapuku (born 6 April 1989) is a New Zealand rugby league player for the Wentworthville Magpies in the New South Wales Cup. He is a Cook Islands international.

References

External links
NSW Cook Islands profile

1989 births
Living people
Cook Islands national rugby league team players
New Zealand rugby league players
New Zealand sportspeople of Cook Island descent
North Sydney Bears NSW Cup players
Rugby league players from Auckland
Rugby league second-rows
Wentworthville Magpies players